The 1971 Sutton Council election took place on 13 May 1971 to elect members of Sutton London Borough Council in London, England. The whole council was up for election and the Conservative party stayed in overall control of the council.

Background

Election result

Ward results

Beddington North

Beddington South

Belmont

Carshalton Central

Carshalton North East

Carshalton North West

Carshalton St. Helier North

Carshalton St. Helier South

Carshalton St. Helier West

Carshalton South East

Carshalton South West

Cheam North

Cheam South

Cheam West

Sutton Central

Sutton East

Sutton North

Sutton North East

Sutton South

Sutton South East

Wallington Central

Wallington North

Wallington South

Worcester Park North

Worcester Park South

References

1971
1971 London Borough council elections